The Hap'nin's is an album by American saxophonist Gigi Gryce recorded in 1960 for the New Jazz label.

Reception

AllMusic reviewer Scott Yanow awarded the album 4 stars stating "The hard bop set has its strong moments even this group was largely forgotten after Gryce's retirement. Worth investigating."

Track listing
All compositions by Gigi Gryce except as indicated
 "Frankie and Johnny" (Traditional) – 7:33
 "Lover Man" (Jimmy Davis, Ram Ramirez, James Sherman) – 5:36
 "Minority" – 6:32
 "Summertime" (George Gershwin, Ira Gershwin, DuBose Heyward) – 8:03
 "Nica’s Tempo" – 4:04
 "Don't Worry 'bout Me" (Rube Bloom, Ted Koehler) – 7:42

Personnel 
Gigi Gryce – alto saxophone 
Richard Williams – trumpet
Richard Wyands – piano
Julian Euell – bass
Mickey Roker – drums

References 

1960 albums
Gigi Gryce albums
New Jazz Records albums
Albums produced by Esmond Edwards
Albums recorded at Van Gelder Studio